Robert Owen Page (23 November 1897 – 14 July 1957) was a New Zealand pacifist and industrial chemist.

Biography
Page was born in Christchurch, New Zealand, on 23 November 1897.
His father, Samuel Page, taught chemistry at Canterbury College, while his mother, Sarah Saunders, was a feminist who promoted social reforms. Robert's friends knew him as Robin, and he attended Christchurch Boys’ High School until 1914. He won a university Junior Scholarship and went to Canterbury College, where he earned a BSc majoring in chemistry in 1917. He was awarded the Sir George Grey Scholarship, a Senior Scholarship and the Haydon Prize.

References

1897 births
1957 deaths
New Zealand chemists
New Zealand pacifists
People from Christchurch
Fellows of the Royal Society of New Zealand
University of Canterbury alumni